Kristian Birger Gundersen (19 October 1907 – 27 May 1977) was a Norwegian politician for the Labour Party.

From 1967 to 1975 Gundersen was the mayor of Hamar. He had been a member of Hamar county council since 1952, and became deputy mayor in 1962.

He served as a deputy representative to the Norwegian Parliament from the Market towns of Hedmark and Oppland counties during the terms 1945–1949 and 1950–1953.

References

1907 births
1977 deaths
Deputy members of the Storting
Labour Party (Norway) politicians
Mayors of places in Hedmark
Politicians from Hamar